A molecular probe is a group of atoms or molecules used in molecular biology or chemistry to study the properties of other molecules or structures. If some measurable property of the molecular probe used changes when it interacts with the analyte (such as a change in absorbance), the interactions between the probe and the analyte can be studied. This makes it possible to indirectly study the properties of compounds and structures which may be hard to study directly.

The choice of molecular probe will depend on which compound or structure is being studied as well as on what property is of interest. Radioactive DNA or RNA sequences are used in molecular genetics to detect the presence of a complementary sequence by molecular hybridization.

Common probes 
 digoxigenin
 ANS
 porphyrin
 BODIPY
 Cyanine
 Hybridization probe

References

External links
 
 

Molecular biology
Biochemistry